Church of St Peter is a  Grade I listed church in Pertenhall, Bedfordshire, England. It became a listed building on 13 July 1964.

See also
Grade I listed buildings in Bedfordshire

References

Church of England church buildings in Bedfordshire
Grade I listed churches in Bedfordshire